Martin Junas (born 9 March 1996) is a Slovak footballer who currently plays for Skalica as a goalkeeper.

Club career

FK Senica
Junas made his professional Fortuna Liga debut for Senica on 30 May 2015 against ŽP Šport Podbrezová.

References

External links
 
 Futbalnet profile

1996 births
Living people
Slovak footballers
Association football goalkeepers
FK Senica players
MFK Topvar Topoľčany players
Slovak Super Liga players
2. Liga (Slovakia) players
Sportspeople from Skalica